Conus sculpturatus is a species of sea snail, a marine gastropod mollusk in the family Conidae, the cone snails and their allies.

Like all species within the genus Conus, these snails are predatory and venomous. They are capable of "stinging" humans, therefore live ones should be handled carefully or not at all.

Description
The size of the shell varies between 32 mm and 44 mm.

Distribution
This marine species occurs off the Philippines.

References

 Röckel, D., and da Motta, A. J., 1986. Conus sculpteratus n. sp., eine neue Art des Conus alabaster - Komplexes von den Philippinen (Prosobranchia: Conidae). Heldia: Münchner Malakologische Mitteilungen, 1 (4 ): 133–135 
 Tucker J.K. & Tenorio M.J. (2009) Systematic classification of Recent and fossil conoidean gastropods. Hackenheim: Conchbooks. 296 pp.
 Puillandre N., Duda T.F., Meyer C., Olivera B.M. & Bouchet P. (2015). One, four or 100 genera? A new classification of the cone snails. Journal of Molluscan Studies. 81: 1–23

External links
 The Conus Biodiversity website
 Cone Shells – Knights of the Sea
 

sculpturatus
Gastropods described in 1986